Emmanuel Poulle (8 June 1928 – 1 August 2011) was a French archivist and historian, specialist in the history of science and the medieval period and was a member of the Institut de France.

Honours 
He was an officier of the Légion d'honneur, commandeur of the Ordre des Palmes académiques and officier of the Ordre des Arts et des Lettres.

Publications 
1963: Un constructeur d'instruments astronomiques au XVe siècle, Jean Fusoris,
1963: La bibliothèque scientifique d'un imprimeur humaniste au XVe siècle
1966: La paléographie des écritures cursives en France du XVe au XVIIe siècle,
1967: Les instruments astronomiques du moyen age, reprinted in 1983
1980: Les instruments de la théorie des planètes selon Ptolemy : équatoires et horlogerie planétaire du XIIIe au XVIe siècle, 2 volumes
1984: Les Tables Aphonsines, avec les canons de Jean de Saxe
1987–1988: Johannis de Dondis, Paduani civis, Astrarium. I, Fac-simile del manoscritto di Padova e traduzione francese, II, édition critique de la version A
2003: Tractatus Astrarii de Giovanni Dondi dell'Orologio, introduction et traduction

External links 
  Notice biographique sur le site de l'Académie des inscriptions et belles-lettres
 Astronomie planétaire au Moyen Age latin (report) on Persée 
 Paléographie des écritures cursives en France du XVe au XVIIe siècle on Persée
 Obituary
 Éloge d'Émmanuel Poulle

Members of the Académie des Inscriptions et Belles-Lettres
French archivists
École Nationale des Chartes alumni
Historians of science
20th-century French historians
French medievalists
French palaeographers
Officiers of the Légion d'honneur
Officiers of the Ordre des Arts et des Lettres
Commandeurs of the Ordre des Palmes Académiques
Scientists from Paris
1928 births
2011 deaths